Karamelik is a village in the Kilis District, Kilis Province, Turkey. The village had a population of 244 in 2022.

In mid-17th century, Ottoman traveller Evliya Çelebi recorded it as a Turkmen village of 100 homes in his seyahatnâme. In late 19th century, German orientalist Martin Hartmann listed the village as a settlement of 20 houses inhabited by Turks and Bedouins.

References

Villages in Kilis District